Priscilla Star Diaz (born June 13, 1994), known by her stage name MISSPSTAR, formerly known as P-Star, is an American rapper, dancer, model, singer, actress, director, and disc jockey. Diaz is best known for her role as Jessica Ruiz in the 2009 PBS Kids Go revival of The Electric Company and as the focus of the PBS Independent Lens documentary P-Star Rising.

Early life
Diaz was born to parents Jesse Diaz, a former rapper, and Doris Diaz, a heroin addict. Diaz grew up in Harlem with her older sister Solsky. Through her mother, Diaz and her older sister have a younger half-sister named Sinclair who later became adopted by Diaz's father. Diaz was born of paternal Puerto Rican and maternal Cuban descent.

Due to her father serving time in jail, Diaz and Solsky lived in a foster home until their father gained custody of the girls and raised them as a single father in Harlem. At the age of seven, Diaz decided she wanted to become a rapper to make a better life for herself and her family after her father's music career had failed and Diaz and her family found themselves living in a shelter.

Career
Diaz began her rap career at the age of 9 in after hours nightclubs in Harlem, battling against other rappers twice her age. She won the Citywide Hip Hop competition in 2005 and became the youngest female entrant. That same year, Diaz recorded an album with Reggaeton Niños as the main vocalist and appeared in the music video for "Oye mi Canto". She signed a recording contract with independent label Hunc Records in 2007 and released her first album titled Welcome to My Show the same year with the song "Biggie Bounce" released as a single. Diaz directed her music videos for "Don't Stop the Dance" and "Sukoshidake Katamomoi". P-Star released two versions of herself singing in English and Japanese.
She appeared in the Off-Broadway production of Take the Train to Maine, 2005's short film Sita and as Jessica Ruiz in the 2009 revival of The Electric Company. Diaz has modeled clothing for Royal Addiction, Baby Phat, J. Lo, and Rocawear. In 2008, Diaz released her exercise DVD "P-Star Workout DVD: Exercise Your Body and Mind, Vol. 1" to help fight childhood obesity. In 2017, P-Star released her comeback single "Don't Sleep On Me" through SoundCloud. Diaz released the single "Broke" under the new stage name 'MISSPSTAR' in 2018 and directed the music video to accompany the single. This was followed by her third single "Left, Right".

Personal life
Diaz was accepted to Denison University in Ohio in 2015, majoring in theater and education. While in attendance at the school, she was a cheerleader and worked as a DJ for the school's radio station. In May 2017, Diaz graduated from Denison University with a BA in Theatre and Education. Diaz started a podcast titled Restless Mother regarding motherhood after the birth of her first child.

Discography

Albums
Welcome to My Show (2008)

Singles
 "Biggie Bounce" (2008)
 "Wanna Make You Dance English" (2008)
 "Wanna Make You Dance Spanish" (2008)
 "Don't Stop the Dance" (2011)
 "Sukoshidake Katamomoi" (2011)
 "Don't Sleep On Me" (2017)
 "Broke" (2018)
 "Left, Right" (2018)
 "2276" (2018)
 “I Rather Fail (Than to Surrender)" (2019)

As a Featured Artist
"They Won't Play Us" (with Kafir) (as P-Star) (2015)
“Ego” - (Kash featuring MISSPSTAR) (2019)
”Grnd On Me” - (Loco Ninja featuring Kash and MISSPSTAR) (2019)

Soundtracks
P-Star Rising  (2007)

DVDs
P-Star Workout DVD: Exercise Your Body and Mind, Vol. 1 (2008)
P-Star Rising (2009)

Compilation albums
Niños Vol. 1 (Reggaeton Niños), 2006

References

External links

Living people
Denison University alumni
21st-century American actresses
21st-century American rappers
Actresses from New York City
1994 births
Film directors from New York City
American child actresses
American child singers
American film actresses
Hispanic and Latino American rappers
American television actresses
American people of Cuban descent
American people of Puerto Rican descent
American beauty pageant winners
American stage actresses
American women rappers
American female dancers
Rappers from the Bronx
People from Harlem
American radio DJs
Rappers from Manhattan
American reggaeton musicians
Songwriters from New York (state)
Spanish-language singers of the United States
Puerto Rican women rappers
Pop rappers
Dancers from New York (state)
21st-century American women singers
21st-century American singers
American women radio presenters
American women podcasters
American podcasters
21st-century women rappers